This is a list of British postage stamps issued by the Royal Mail postal service of the United Kingdom, normally referred to in philatelic circles as Great Britain. This list should be consistent with printed publications, and cite sources of any deviation (e.g., magazine issue listing newly found variations).

Queen Victoria

Line engraved

 One Penny Black issued on 1 May for use from 6 May 1840
 Penny Black VR official
 Penny Blue
 Two penny blue contemporary issue with the Penny Black
 One Penny Red issued in 1841 to replace the Penny Black (the first issue with perforations from 1848)
 Prince Consort Essay
 Two penny blue printed in a new ink. The design has the addition of white * lines above and below the inscriptions
 Halfpenny Rose Red issued in 1870 for the reduced postcard and newspaper rate
 Three Halfpence Red introduced in 1870 for the reduced printed matter rate

Embossed
 Sixpence embossed, 1847–54
 Ten Pence embossed, 1847–54
 One Shilling embossed, 1847–54

Surface printed
 4d, 6d, 1s, 1855–57 (no corner letters)
 3d to 1s, 1862–64 (small white corner letters)
 3d to 10d, 1865–67 (large white corner letters)
 3d to 2s, 1867–80 (large white corner letters – new watermark)
 High value definitives, 5s to £5 1867–83
 Low value definitives, 1873–80 (coloured corner letters)
 Low value definitives, halfpenny to 5d 1880–81
 Penny Lilac 1881, the most issued Victorian stamp
 High value definitives, 2/6 to £1 1883–84
 Lilac and Green low value definitives 1883
 Jubilee issue postage stamps 1887–92

King Edward VII
 Definitives halfpenny to £1, 1902 (printed by De La Rue & Co.)
 Definitives halfpenny to 4d, 1911 (printed by Harrison and Sons)
 Definitives d to £1, 1911–13 (printed at Somerset House)

King George V
 Definitives halfpenny, 1d, 1911–12 "Mackennals" (designed by Bertram Mackennal)
 Definitives halfpenny, 1d, 1912 "Mackennals" (lion shaded)
 Low value definitives, 1912–24 (halfpenny to 1s)
 High value definitives, 1913–18, "Seahorses"
 Postage due stamps, 1914 (halfpenny to 1s)
 British Empire Exhibition Postage Stamps (first commemorative issue)
 Universal Postal Union Congress, London 10 May 1929 (halfpenny to twopence halfpenny and £1)
 Low value definitives, 1934–36 (halfpenny to 1s)
 High value definitives, 1934, "Seahorses" (re-engraved)
 Silver Jubilee 7 May 1935 (first issue to commemorate a royal event)

King Edward VIII
 Edward VIII postage stamps

King George VI

 Low value definitives (original dark colours)
 Low value definitives (pale colours)
 Low value definitives (changed colours)
 High value definitives (original square format)
 High value definitives (rectangular format) 1951
 Coronation 12 May 1937 (first issue to include the Queen's portrait as well as the King's)
 Centenary of the postage stamp 6 May 1940
 Victory 11 June 1946
 Silver wedding 26 April 1948 (first issue to commemorate a personal Royal occasion rather than a state event, £1 value was the first British stamp designed by a woman and the issue is notable for the omission of the words 'postage' and 'revenue').
 Channel Islands Liberation 10 May 1948
 Olympic Games 29 July 1948
 Universal Postal Union (UPU) 10 October 1949
 Festival of Britain 3 May 1951

Queen Elizabeth II (pre-decimalisation)

1952–54
 Low value definitives known as Wildings, 5 December 1952, 31 August 1953, 15 October 1954

1953
 Coronation, 2 June

1955
 Castles high value definitives, 1 September, 23 September, reprinted 1958, 1963, 1967

1957
 World Scout Jubilee Jamboree, 1 August
 46th Inter-Parliamentary Union Conference, 12 September
 Low value Wilding definitives with graphite-lines, 19 November (first graphite-lined issue)

1958
 Sixth British Empire and Commonwealth Games, Cardiff, 18 July

1959
 Low value Wilding definitives with phosphor bands, 18 November (first phosphor issue)

1960
 Tercentenary of Establishment of General Letter Office, 7 July
 First Anniversary of European Postal and Telecommunications Conference, 19 September

1961
 Centenary of Post Office Savings Bank, 28 August
 European Postal and Telecommunications (C.E.P.T.) Conference, Torquay, 18 September (first issue printed in more than two colours)
 Seventh Commonwealth Parliamentary Conference, 25 September

1962
Note: Issues between 1962 and 1966 inclusive are available in two varieties – with, and without, phosphor bands (which fluoresce in ultra-violet light). These were introduced to help sorting machines distinguish between first and second class letters automatically and the early examples with phosphor bands (up to the 1965 Salvation Army issue) are worth several times those without.

 National Productivity Year, 14 November

1963
 Freedom from Hunger, 21 March
 Centenary of the Paris Postal Conference, 7 May
 National Nature Week, 16 May
 Ninth International Lifeboat Conference, Edinburgh, 31 May
 Red Cross Centenary Congress, 15 August
 Opening of COMPAC (Trans-Pacific Telephone Cable), 3 December

1964
 Shakespeare Festival, 23 April
Note: First commemorative set to feature in an illustrated Presentation Pack, including mint stamps, with descriptive notes and protective covering. Also first set for which there was an official Post Office issue illustrated First Day Cover envelope and first set to commemorate a person from history.
 20th International Geographical Congress, London, 1 July
 Tenth International Botanical Congress, Edinburgh, 5 August
 Opening of Forth Road Bridge, 4 September

1965
 Winston Churchill Commemoration (2 stamps, 4d & 1/3), 8 July
 700th Anniversary of Simon de Montfort's Parliament (2 stamps, 6d & 2/6), 19 July
 Salvation Army Centenary, (2 stamps, 3d & 1/6), 9 August
 Centenary of Joseph Lister's Discovery of Antiseptic Surgery, (2 stamps), 1 September
 Commonwealth Arts Festival (2 stamps), 1 September
 25th Anniversary of Battle of Britain (8 stamps + 4d values as block of 6), 13 September
 Opening of Post Office Tower (2 stamps), 8 October
 20th Anniversary of UNO and International Cooperation Year (2 stamps), 25 October
 International Telecommunication Union (ITU) Centenary (2 stamps), 15 November

1966
 Burns Commemoration, 25 January
 900th Anniversary of Westminster Abbey, 28 February
 Landscapes, 2 May
 World Cup Football Championship, 1 June
 British Birds, 8 August
 England's World Cup Football Victory, 18 August
 British Technology, 19 September
 900th Anniversary of Battle of Hastings, 14 October
 Christmas 1966, 1 December (the first Christmas issue)

1967
 European Free Trade Association (EFTA), 20 February
 British Wild Flowers, 24 April
 British Paintings, 10 July
 Sir Francis Chichester's World Voyage, 24 July
 British Discovery and Invention, 19 September (last watermarked issue)
 Christmas 1967, 18 October and 27 November
Also this year, in two issues, the first Machin definitives (4d, 1s, and 1/9 in the first issue); the remaining values were issued later in 1967 (3d, 9d, and 1/6) and on two dates in 1968.

1968
 British Bridges, 29 April (synthetic PVA gum used from this issue)
 British Anniversaries, 29 May
 British Paintings, 12 August
 Christmas 1968, 25 November

1969
British Ships, 15 January
First Flight of Concorde, 3 March
Anniversaries, 2 April
British Architecture (Cathedrals), 28 May
Investiture of The Prince of Wales, 1 July
Gandhi Centenary Year, 13 August
British Post Office Technology, 1 October
Christmas 1969, 26 November

1970

 British Rural Architecture (4 stamps), 11 February
 Anniversaries (5 stamps), 1 April
 London 6 at 4d (Sun Life Assurance Co. of Canada, 6 stamps) May — rare, only four known in existence
 Literary Anniversaries (5 stamps), 3 June
 Decimal Currency: Machin design of 10p, 20p, 50p and £1 (4 stamps), 17 June
 Ninth British Commonwealth Games (3 stamps), Edinburgh, 15 July
 Philympia 1970 stamp exhibition (3 stamps), 18 September
 Christmas 1970 (3 stamps), 25 November

Queen Elizabeth II (Decimal currency)

1971

 Decimal Currency Machins: p, 1p, p, 2p, p, 3p, p, 4p, 5p, 6p, p, and 9p (12 stamps), 15 February
 'Ulster ’71' Paintings (3 stamps), 16 June
 Literary Anniversaries (3 stamps), 28 July
 Decimal Currency Machin: 10p small format (1 stamp), 8 August
 British Anniversaries (3 stamps),  25 August
 British Architecture: Modern University Buildings (4 stamps),  22 September
 Christmas 1971 (3 stamps),  31 October

1972
 British Polar Explorers (4 stamps), 16 February
 General Anniversaries (3 stamps), 26 April
 British Architecture: Village Churches (5 stamps), 21 June
 Broadcasting Anniversaries (4 stamps), 13 September
 Christmas 1972 (3 stamps), 18 October
 Royal Silver Wedding (2 stamps), 20 November (first issue with "all over" phosphor)

1973
 British Entry into European Communities, 3 January
 British Trees (1st Issue), 28 February
 British Explorers, 18 April
 County Cricket 1873–1973, 16 May
 Artistic Anniversaries, 4 July
 400th Anniversary of the Birth of Inigo Jones (architect and designer), 15 August
 19th Commonwealth Parliamentary Conference, 12 September
 Royal Wedding, 14 November
 Christmas, 28 November

1974
 British Trees (2nd issue), 27 February
 Bicentenary of the Fire Prevention (Metropolis) Act, 24 April
 Centenary of Universal Postal Union, 12 June
 Medieval Warriors, 10 July
 Birth Centenary of Winston Churchill, 9 October
 Christmas, 27 November

1975
 Health and Handicap Funds, 22 January
 Birth Bicentenary of J.M.W. Turner (painter), 19 February
 European Architectural Heritage Year, 23 April
 Sailing, 11 June
 150th Anniversary of Public Railways, 13 August
 62nd Inter-Parliamentary Union Conference, 3 September
 Birth Bicentenary of Jane Austen (novelist), 22 October
 Christmas, 26 November

1976
 Telephone Centenary, 10 March
 Social Reformers, 28 April
 Bicentenary of American Revolution, 2 June
 Centenary of Royal National Rose Society, 30 June
 British Cultural Traditions, 4 August
 500th Anniversary of British Printing, 29 September
 Christmas, 24 November

1977
 Racket Sports, 12 January
 Centenary of Royal Institute of Chemistry, 2 March
 Silver Jubilee, 11 May
 Commonwealth Heads of Government Meeting 1977, London, 8 June
 British Wildlife, 5 October
 Christmas, 23 November

1978
 Energy Resources, 25 January
 British Architecture: Historic Buildings (4 stamps + MS), 1 March
 25th Anniversary of Coronation, 31 May
 Horses, 5 July
 Centenaries of Cyclists Touring Club and British Cycling Federation, 2 August
 Christmas, 22 November

1979
 Dogs, 7 February
 Spring Wild Flowers, 21 March
 First Direct Elections to European Assembly, 9 May
 Horseracing paintings and Bicentenary of The Derby, 6 June
 International Year of the Child (4 stamps), 11 July
 Death Centenary of Sir Rowland Hill (4 stamps and Minisheet including all four stamps), 22 August
 150th Anniversary of Metropolitan Police, 26 September
 Christmas 1979, 21 November

1980

 Centenary of Wild Bird Protection Act (4 stamps), 16 January
 150th Anniversary of Liverpool and Manchester Railway (5 stamps + strip of 5), 12 March
 London 1980: International Stamp Exhibition (1 stamp and Minisheet), 9 April
 London Landmarks (5 stamps), 7 May
 Famous Authoresses (4 stamps), 4 July
 80th Birthday of Queen Elizabeth, the Queen Mother (1 stamp), 4 August (first issue to commemorate a Royal birthday)
 British Conductors (4 stamps), 10 September
 Sport Centenaries (4 stamps), 10 October
 Christmas 1980 (5 stamps), 10 November

1981
 Folklore (4 stamps), 6 February
 International Year of the Disabled (4 stamps), 25 March
 Butterflies (4 stamps), 13 May
 50th Anniversary of the National Trust for Scotland (5 stamps), 24 June
 Wedding of Charles, Prince of Wales and Lady Diana Spencer (2 stamps), 22 July
 25th Anniversary of Duke of Edinburgh's Award Scheme (4 stamps), 12 August
 Fishing Industry (4 stamps), 23 September
 Christmas (Children's paintings) (5 stamps), 18 November

1982
Charles Darwin (4 stamps), 10 February
Youth Organisations (4 stamps), 24 March
British Theatre (4 stamps), 28 April
??? Pack number 135
Maritime Heritage (5 stamps), 16 June
British Textiles (4 stamps), 23 July
Information Technology (2 stamps), 8 September
British Motor Cars (4 stamps), 13 October
Christmas (Carols) (5 stamps),17 November

1983
British River Fishes (4 stamps), 26 January
Commonwealth Day Monday 14 March (4 stamps), 9 March
British Engineering Achievements (3 stamps), 25 May
The British Army (5 Stamps), 6 July
British Gardens (4 stamps), 24 August
British Fairs (4 stamps), 5 October
Christmas (5 stamps), 16 November

1984
Heraldry (4 stamps), 17 January
Cattle (5 stamps), 6 March
Urban Renewal (4 stamps), 10 April
Europa, CEPT 25th anniversary The Second European Election (2 strips of 2 stamps), 15 May
Greenwich 1884– Meridian −1984 (4 stamps), 26 June
The Royal Mail (strip of 5 stamps), 31 July
The British Council 1934 – 1984 (4 stamps), 25 September
Christmas (The Nativity) (3 stamps), 20 November

1985
Famous Trains (5 stamps), 22 January
Insects (5 stamps), 12 March
British Composers (4 stamps), 14 May
Safety at Sea (4 stamps), 18 June
Royal Mail (4 stamps), 30 July
Arthurian Legend (4 stamps), 3 September
British Films (5 stamps), 8 October
Christmas (Pantomime) (5 stamps), 19 November

1986
Industry Year (4 stamps), 14 January
Halley's Comet (4 stamps), 18 February
60th Birthday of Queen Elizabeth II (4 stamps, 2×2 se-tenant), 21 April
Europa. Nature Conservation, Endangered Species (4 stamps), 20 May
Medieval Life (4 stamps), 17 June
Sport (5 stamps), 15 July
Royal Wedding of Prince Andrew, Duke of York and Sarah Ferguson (2 stamps), 22 July
Commonwealth Parliamentary Conference, (1 stamp), 19 August
Royal Air Force, (5 stamps), 16 September
Christmas (Traditions) (6 stamps), 18 November

1987
Flowers, (4 stamps), 6 January
Sir Isaac Newton, (4 stamps), 24 March
British Architects in Europe, (4 stamps), 12 May
St John Ambulance, (4 stamps), 16 June
Scottish Heraldry, (4 stamps), 21 June
Victorian Britain, (4 stamps), 8 September
Studio Pottery, (4 stamps), 13 October
Christmas, (5 stamps), 17 November

1988 
Bicentenary of Linnean Society, (4 stamps), 19 January
400th Anniversary of the Welsh Bible, (4 stamps), 1 March
Sports Organisations, (4 stamps), 22 March
Transport and Mail Services, Europa, (4 stamps), 10 May
Australian Bicentenary (4 stamps), 21 June
Spanish Armada, (5 stamps), 19 July
Centenary of death of Edward Lear, (4 stamps), 6 September
Castle high value definitives, (4 stamps), 18 October
Christmas, (5 stamps), 15 November

1989
Centenary of the Royal Society for the Protection of Birds, (4 stamps), 17 January
Greetings stamps, (5 stamps), 31 January
Food and Farming Year, (4 stamps), 7 March
Anniversaries & Events, (4 stamps), 11 April
Toys and Games, Europa, (4 stamps), 16 May
Industrial Archaeology, (4 stamps), 4 July
150th Anniversary of the Royal Microscopical Society, (4 stamps), 5 September
Lord Mayor's Show, (5 stamps), 17 October
800th Anniversary of Ely Cathedral, (5 stamps), 14 November

1990 

 150th Anniversary of Royal Society for the Prevention of Cruelty to Animals, 23 January
 Greetings Booklet Stamps. 'Smiles', 6 February
 Europa and 'Glasgow 1990 European City of Culture', 6 March
 25th Anniversary of Queen's Award for Export and Technology, 10 April
 'Stamp World London 90' International Stamp Exhibition, London, 3 May
 150th Anniversary of Kew Gardens, 5 June
 150th Birth Anniversary of Thomas Hardy (author), 10 July
 90th Birthday of Queen Elizabeth the Queen Mother, 2 August
 Gallantry Awards, 11 September
 Astronomy, 16 October
 Christmas, 13 November

1991
 Dogs. Paintings by George Stubbs, 8 January
 Greetings Booklet Stamps 'Good Luck', 6 February
 Scientific Achievements, 5 March
 Greetings Booklet Stamps. 'Smiles', 26 March
 Europa. Europe in Space, 23 April
 World Student Games, Sheffield and World Cup Rugby Championship, London, 11 June
 9th World Congress of Roses, Belfast. Wood engravings by Yvonne Skargon. 16 July
 150th Anniversary of Dinosaurs Identification by Owen, 28 August
 Bicentenary of Ordnance Survey. Maps of Hamstreet, Kent, 17 September
 Christmas. Illustrated Manuscripts from the Bodleian Library, Oxford, 12 November

1992
 The Four Seasons: Wintertime, 14 January
 Greeting Stamps: Memories, 28 January
 40th Anniversary of Accession, 6 February
 Death Centenary of Alfred, Lord Tennyson, 10 March
 Europa: International Events, 7 April
 350th Anniversary of the Civil War, 16 June
 150th Birth Anniversary of Sir Arthur Sullivan, Gilbert and Sullivan Operas, 21 July
 Protection of the Environment. Children's Paintings, 15 September
 Single European Market, 13 October
 Christmas 1992: Stained Glass Windows, 10 November

1993
 600th Anniversary of Abbotsbury Swannery, 19 January
 Greeting Stamps. 'Gift Giving', 2 February
 300th Birth Anniversary of John Harrison (inventor of the marine chronometer). Details of the 'H4' clock, 16 February
 14th World Orchid Conference, Glasgow, 16 March
 Europa. Contemporary Art, 11 May
 Roman Britain, 15 June
 Inland Waterways, 20 July
 The Four Seasons. Autumn. Fruits and Leaves, 14 September
 Sherlock Holmes. Centenary of the Publication of The Final Problem, 12 October
 Christmas. 150th Anniversary of Publication of A Christmas Carol, 9 November

1994
 The Age of Steam. Railway Photographs by Colin Gifford, 18 January
 Greeting Stamps. 'Messages', 1 February
 Postage due stamps, 15 February (the final issue of postage due stamps that had been introduced in 1914)
 25th Anniversary of Investiture of The Prince of Wales. Paintings by The Prince of Wales, 1 March
 Centenary of Picture Postcards, 12 April
 Opening of Channel Tunnel, 3 May
 50th Anniversary of D-Day, 6 June
 Scottish Golf Courses, 5 July
 The Four Seasons. Summertime Events, 2 August
 Europa. Medical Discoveries, 27 September
 Christmas. Children's Nativity Plays, 1 November

1995
 Cats, 17 January
 The Four Seasons. Springtime. Plant Sculptures by Andy Goldsworthy, 14 March
 Greetings Stamp. 'Greetings in Arts', 21 March
 Centenary of National Trust, 11 April
 Europa. Peace and Freedom, 2 May
 Science fiction. Novels by H.G. Wells 6 June
 Reconstruction of Shakespeares Globe Theatre, 8 August
 Pioneers of Communications, 5 September
 Centenary of Rugby league, 3 October
 Christmas. Christmas Robins, 30 October

1996
 Death Bicentenary of Robert Burns (Scottish poet), 25 January
 Greetings Stamps. Cartoons, 26 February
 50th Anniversary of the Wildfowl and Wetlands Trust. Bird Paintings by C.F. Tunnicliffe, 12 March
 Centenary of Cinema, 16 April
 European Football Championship, 14 May
 Olympic and Paralympic Games, Atlanta, 9 July
 Europa. Famous Women, 6 August
 50th Anniversary of Children's Television, 3 September
 Classic Sports Cars, 1 October
 Christmas, 28 October

1997
 Greetings Stamps. 19th-century Flower Paintings, 6 January
 450th Death Anniversary of King Henry VIII, 21 January
 Religious Anniversaries, 11 March
 Europa. Tales and Legends. Horror Stories, 13 May
 British Aircraft Designers, 10 June
 'All The Queens Horses'. 50th Anniversary of the British Horse Society, 8 July
 Sub-Post Offices, 12 August
 Birth Centenary of Enid Blyton (children's author), 9 September
 Christmas. 150th Anniversary of the Christmas Cracker, 27 October
 Royal Golden Wedding, 13 November

1998
 Endangered Species, 20 January
 Diana, Princess of Wales Commemoration, 3 February
 650th Anniversary of the Order of the Garter. The Queen's Beasts, 24 February
 Lighthouses, 24 March
 Comedians, 23 April
 50th Anniversary of National Health Service, 23 June
 Famous Children's Fantasy Novels, 21 July
 Europa. Festivals. Notting Hill Carnival, 25 August
 British Land Speed Record Holders, 29 September
 Christmas. Angels, 2 November

1999
 Millennium stamp Series. The Inventors' Tale, 12 January
 Millennium stamp Series. The Travellers' Tale, 2 February
 Millennium stamp Series. The Patients's Tale, 2 March
 Millennium stamp Series. The Settlers' Tale, 6 April
 Millennium stamp Series. The Workers' Tale, 4 May
 Millennium stamp Series. The Entertainers' Tale, 1 June
 Royal wedding, 15 June
 Millennium stamp Series. The Citizens' Tale, 6 July
 Millennium stamp Series. The Scientists' Tale, 3 August
 Solar Eclipse, 11 August
 Millennium stamp Series. The Farmers' Tale. Includes 1999 Europa issue, 7 September
 Millennium stamp Series. The Soldiers' Tale, 5 October
 Millennium stamp Series. The Christians' Tale, 2 November
 Millennium stamp Series. The Artists' Tale, 7 December
 Millennium stamp Series. 'Millennium Timekeeper', 14 December

2000

 New Millennium stamp, 6 January
 Millennium stamp Projects (1st Series). 'Above and Beyond', 18 January
 Millennium stamp Projects (2nd Series). 'Fire and Light', 1 February
 Millennium stamp Projects (3rd Series). 'Water and Coast', 7 March
 Millennium stamp Projects (4th Series). 'Life and Earth', (2nd) ECOS Ballymena, (1st) Web of Life Exhibition at London Zoo, 44p Earth Centre Doncaster, 64p Project SUZY Teesside. Printed by De La Rue Security Print. 4 April
 Millennium stamp Projects (5th Series). 'Art and Craft', 2 May
 'Stamp Show 2000' International Stamp Exhibition, London. 'Her Majesty's Stamps', 23 May
 Millennium stamp Projects (6th Series). 'People and Places', 6 June
 Millennium stamp Projects (7th Series). 'Stone and Soil', 4 July
 Millennium stamp Projects (8th Series). 'Tree and Leaf', 1 August
 Queen Elizabeth the Queen Mother's 100th Birthday, 4 August
 Millennium stamp Projects (9th Series). 'Mind and Matter', 5 September
 Millennium stamp Projects (10th Series). 'Body and Bone', 3 October
 Millennium stamp Projects (11th Series). 'Spirit and Faith', 7 November
 Millennium stamp Projects (12th Series). 'Sound and Vision', 5 December

2001

 The Millennium stamp, 16 January
 Centenary of the Death of Queen Victoria, 29 January
 Silver hallmarks, 6 February
 Cats and Dogs, 13 February
 Northern Ireland Definitives, 6 March
 Weather, 12 March
 Centenary of the Royal Navy Submarine Service, 10 April
 England Definitives, 23 April
 Double-decker Buses, 15 May
 Fabulous Hats, 19 June
 Smiles,  3 July
 Pond Life, 10 July
 Puppets, Punch and Judy, 4 September
 Centenary of the Nobel Prizes, 2 October
 Centenary of the Royal Navy Submarine Service, Flags 22 October
 Christmas, Robins 6 November

2002
 Centenary of Publication of Rudyard Kipling's Just So Stories, 15 January
 Golden Jubilee, 6 February
 Wilding Definitive of 1952–54, 6 February
 Greetings Stamps "Occasions", 5 March
 British Coastlines, 19 March
 Europa, Circus, 10 April
 Queen Elizabeth the Queen Mother Commemoration, 25 April
 50th Anniversary of Passenger Jet Aviation, 2 May
 World Cup Football Championship, Japan and Korea, 21 May
 17th Commonwealth Games, Manchester, 16 July
 150th Anniversary of Great Ormond Street Children's Hospital, 20 August
 Bridges of London, 10 September
 Astronomy Sheet, 24 September
 150th Anniversary of the First Pillar Box, 8 October
 Christmas 2002, 5 November
 50th Anniversary of Wilding Definitives sheet, 5 December

2003
 Birds of Prey, 14 January
 Greetings Stamps "Occasions", 4 February
 50th Anniversary of Discovery of DNA, 25 February
 Fruit and Vegetables, 25 March
 Overseas Booklet Stamps, 27 March
 Extreme Endeavours (British Explorers), 29 April
 50th Anniversary of Coronation, 2 June
 21st Birthday of Prince William of Wales, 17 June
 A British Journey, Scotland, 15 July
 Europa, British Pub Signs, 12 August
 Classic Transport Toys, 18 September
 250th Anniversary of the British Museum, 7 October
 Christmas 2003, 4 November
 England's Victory in Rugby World Cup sheet, 19 December

2004
Classic locomotives, 13 January
Occasions 2004, 3 February
The Lord of the Rings, 26 February
Northern Ireland, 16 March
Entente Cordiale, 6 April
Ocean Liners, 13 April
Royal Horticultural Society, 25 May
Wales, 15 June
Royal Society of Arts, 10 August
Woodland Animals, 16 September
Crimea, 12 October
Christmas 2004, 2 November

2005
Farm Animals, 11 January
South West England, 8 February
Jane Eyre, 24 February
Magic!, 15 March
Castle series Definitives, 22 March
World Heritage Sites, 21 April
Trooping the Colour, 7 June
Motorcycles, 19 July
A Celebration of Food, 23 August
Classic ITV, 15 September
Trafalgar, 18 October
Christmas 2005, 1 November

2006
Animal Tales, 10 January
England, 7 February
Brunel, 23 February
Opening of the Welsh Assembly Building, 1 March
Ice Age Animals, 21 March
Definitives and country stamps for new postage rates, 28 March
Her Majesty The Queen's 80th Birthday, 18 April
World Cup Winners, 6 June
Modern Architecture, 20 June
National Portrait Gallery, 18 July
Three Kings, 31 August
Victoria Cross, 21 September
Sounds of Britain, 3 October
Christmas 2006, 7 November
Lest We Forget, 9 November

2007
The Beatles, 9 January
Sea Life, 1 February
The Sky at Night, 13 February
World of Invention, 1 March
Abolition of the Slave Trade, 22 March
Celebrating England, 23 April
Beside the Seaside, 15 May
40th Anniversary of the Machin, 5 June
Grand Prix, 3 July
10th Anniversary of the First Harry Potter Book, 17 July
Scouts, 26 July
British Army Uniforms, 20 September
Endangered Species – Birds, 4 September
The Queen's 60th Wedding Anniversary, 16 October
Christmas, 6 November
Lest We Forget, 8 November

2008
James Bond Centenary of Birth of Ian Fleming (6 stamps + Prestige Book), 8 January
LOVE (Booklet), 15 January
Working Dogs Centenary (6 stamps) 5 February
Kings & Queens (Part 1) (Houses of Lancaster and York) (6 stamps + MS), 28 February
Greetings Booklet, 28 February
Celebrating Northern Ireland (MS) and Glorious N.Ireland (Smilers sheet), 11 March
Mayday – Rescue at Sea (6 stamps), 13 March
New Machin definitives & Country stamps for new postage rates, 1 April
Territorial Army Centenary (Commemorative Sheet), 1 April
Insects 'Action for Species' 2 (10 stamps), 15 April
Cathedrals 300th anniversary of completion of St Paul's Cathedral: (6 stamps + MS), 13 May
Retail booklet – Summer holidays, 13 May
Classic Films "Carry on" and "Hammer" Films anniversaries (6 stamps), 10 June
London 1908 Olympics (Commemorative Sheet), 23 June
Airshows (6 stamps), 17 July
Beijing Expo (Smilers Sheet) August
Olympics Handover – 2008 Beijing Olympics (MS), 26 August
British RAF Uniforms – (6 stamps + Prestige Book), 18 September
Country Definitives – 50th anniversary. (MS of 9 stamps + Prestige Book), 29 September
Glorious UK (Smilers sheet), 29 September
Women of Distinction (6 stamps), 14 October
Christmas – Pantomime (6 stamps + MS + Smilers), 4 November
Lest We Forget – 90th anniversary of end of the First World War (MS), 6 November

2009
Design Classics (10 stamps + Prestige Book + Smilers + Self Adhesive retail books released in February, April and September), 13 January
250th Anniversary of the birth of Robert Burns (MS), 22 January
200th Anniversary of the birth of Charles Darwin (6 stamps + MS + Prestige Book), 12 February
Celebrating Wales (MS), 26 February
Pioneers of the Industrial Revolution (8 stamps), 17 March
New Machin Definitives and Country Stamps for new postage rates April
Kings & Queens Part 2 (Tudors) (6 stamps +MS), 21 April
Endangered Plants & 250th Anniversary of Kew Gardens (10 stamps + MS), 19 May
Treasure of the Archive (Prestige Book) May
Mythical Creatures (6 stamps), 16 June
Olympic Disciplines (10 stamps) July
Postboxes (MS), 18 August
Fire Brigade (6 stamps), 1 September
Royal Navy Uniforms (6 stamp + Prestige Book), 17 September
Eminent Britons (10 stamps), 8 October
Olympic & Paralympic Games (20 stamps), 22 October
Christmas – The Nativity Story as depicted on church stained glass (7 stamps + MS + Smilers), 3 November

2010

Classic Album Covers, 7 January
Girl Guiding, 2 February
The Royal Society, 25 February
Battersea Dogs and Cats Home, 11 March
Kings and Queens – The Stewarts, 23 March
Mammals, 13 April
King George V sheet, 6 May
Festival of Stamps sheet, 8 May
London 2010 sheet, 8 May
Britain Alone, 13 May
The Stuarts, 15 June
Olympic Games, 27 July
Great British Railways, 19 August
Winnie the Pooh, 12 October
Wallace and Gromit X-mas, MS, Generic Smiler 2 November

2011
Classic Children's Television, the Genius of Gerry Anderson – set of 6 & lenticular miniature sheet and Thunderbirds Retail Booklet, 11 January
Pictorial Faststamps, Birds II – Garden Birds 2, 24 January
Classic Locomotives of England, Minisheet, 1st Feb
Indipex Stamp Exhibition Generic Smilers Sheet – 20 x Union flag, 10x labels incl 1969 Gandhi stamp, 12th Feb
West End Stage Musicals set of 6, 24th Feb
Retail Booklet: British Heart Foundation 50th Anniv: has Medical Breakthroughs Beta-Blockers 1st stamp, 24th Feb
Magical Realms – including Discworld, Narnia, Harry Potter, King Arthur: set of 8, 8 March
50th Anniv World Wide Fund for Nature – set of 10, MS & Prestige Booklet, 22 March
Commemorative Sheet 50th anniversary of Jaguar E-type, 30 March
Royal Shakespeare Company 50th Anniversary set of 6 + Minisheet, 12 April
Royal Wedding – miniature sheet of 4 stamps, 21 April
William Morris & Co 150th Anniversary set of 6 + Prestige Booklet, 5 May
Pictorial Faststamps, Water Birds 3 – Mallard, Mute Swan, Kingfisher, Moorhen, Greylag Goose and Great Crested Grebe, 19 May
Rev Wilbert Awdry Birth Cent. (author, Thomas the Tank Engine stories) Set of 6, Minisheet and booklet, 14 June
The Duke of Edinburgh's 90th Birthday Commemorative Sheet, 14 June
Olympics/Paralympics III – and retail booklet 5, a Commemorative Sheet and a Composite Sheet/30 stamps, 27 June
Phila'nippon 11, Japan, Exhibition Generic Smilers Sheet, 28 July
The Crown Jewels set of 8, 23 August
Classic Locomotives of England retail booklet, 23 August
World's First Scheduled Airmail, Windsor – Minisheet and Prestige stamp book, 9 September
Arnold Machin Birth Centenary miniature sheet, 14 September
Kings & Queens, House of Hanover, set of 6 + Minisheet, 15 September
Olympics/Paralympics retail booklet 6, 15 September
350th Anniv of the Postmark – Generic Smilers Sheet, 15 September
Pictorial Faststamps, Birds 4 – Sea birds, 16 September
A-Z of the United Kingdom (part 1 – 12 stamps, A-L), 13 October
Retail booklets: 6 x 1st with 2012 Stamp Calendar on inside cover. 12 x 2nd, 12 x 1st, 4 x 2nd Large, 4 x 1st *Large all with Forest Stewardship Council logo, 25 October
Christmas 400th Anniv. of the King James Version of the Bible – set of 7, MS, Smilers Sheet, Stamp booklets, 8th Nov

2012

5 January –    Olympic and Paralympic Games Definitive Stamps
10 January –	Roald Dahl
20 January –   Year Of The Dragon Generic Smilers Sheet
2 February –	The House of Windsor (Kings and Queens 6) Set and MS
6 February –	HM The Queen's Diamond Jubilee definitive + MS
23 February –	Britons of Distinction (Basil Spence, Frederick Delius, Mary 'May' Morris, Odette Hallowes, Thomas Newcomen, Kathleen Ferrier, Augustus Pugin, Montague Rhodes James, Alan Turing, Joan Mary Fry)
24 February –  Fast Stamps -Agriculture
8 March –	Classic Locomotives of Scotland MS
20 March –	World of Children's Comics
10 April –	A-Z of the UK, part 2 (14 stamps)
24 April –     Post & Go – Pigs
15 May –	Design Classics, Fashion
21 May –       Post & Go – Union Flag
31 May –	HM The Queen's Diamond Jubilee
19 June –	Charles Dickens
27 July –	Olympic Games (Welcome)
July–August –	GB Gold medal winners; stamps issued within 24 hours of event
Helen Glover and Heather Stanning – Women's coxless pair
Bradley Wiggins – Men's road time trial
Tim Baillie and Etienne Stott – Men's slalom C-2
Peter Wilson – Men's double trap
Philip Hindes, Chris Hoy and Jason Kenny – Men's team sprint
Katherine Grainger and Anna Watkins – Women's double sculls
Steven Burke, Ed Clancy, Peter Kennaugh and Geraint Thomas – Men's team pursuit
Victoria Pendleton – Women's keirin
Katherine Copeland and Sophie Hosking – Women's lightweight double sculls
Alex Gregory, Tom James, Pete Reed and Andrew Triggs Hodge – Men's coxless four
Danielle King, Joanna Rowsell and Laura Trott – Women's team pursuit
Jessica Ennis – Women's heptathlon
Greg Rutherford – Men's long jump
Mo Farah – Men's 10,000 metres
Ben Ainslie – Finn class
Andy Murray – Men's singles
Scott Brash, Peter Charles, Ben Maher and Nick Skelton – Team jumping
Jason Kenny – Men's sprint
Alistair Brownlee – Men's triathlon
Laura Bechtolsheimer, Charlotte Dujardin, Carl Hester – Team dressage
Laura Trott – Women's omnium
Chris Hoy – Men's keirin
Charlotte Dujardin – Individual dressage
Nicola Adams – Women's flyweight
Jade Jones – Women's 57kg
Ed McKeever – Men’s K-1 200 metres
Mo Farah – Men's 5,000 metres
Luke Campbell – Men's bantamweight
Anthony Joshua – Men's super heavyweight
29 August –    Paralympic Games (Welcome)
27 September –	Olympic and Paralympic Games (Memories)
28 September – Post & Go – Cattle
16 October –	World of Dinosaurs
30 October –	Space Science
8 November –	Christmas 2012

2013
9 January –	150th anniversary of the London Underground
21 February –	Jane Austen
22 February –	Post and Go – Freshwater Life 1 : Ponds Stamp Set
26 March –	Classic TV – 50 years of Dr Who 		
16 March – 	Great Britons 
9 May – 	Football Heroes 		
30 May – 	Royal Portraits – Her Majesty the Queen 		
18 June – 	Classic Locomotives of Northern Ireland 		
11 July – 	Butterflies 		
8 August – 	Andy Murray 		
13 August – 	British Auto Legends 		
19 September –	Merchant Navy 	
20 September –	Post & Go – Freshwater Life 3 : River Life Set
10 October –	Dinosaurs 		
5 November –	Christmas

2014
7 January – 	Classic Children's TV 		
4 February –	Working Horses 		
20 February –	Classic Locomotives of Wales 	
21 February –	Post & Go – British Flora 1 : Spring Blooms
25 March –	Remarkable Lives 		
15 April – 	Buckingham Palace 		
13 May –	Great British Film 		
5 June –	Sustainable Fish 		
17 July –	Glasgow 2014 (XX Commonwealth Games) 		
28 July –	The Great War 1914
18 September –	Seaside Architecture
19 September –	Post & Go – British Flora 2 : Symbolic Flowers
14 October –	Prime Ministers
4 November  –	Christmas
13 November  –	Post & Go – British Flora 3 : Winter Greenery

2015
6 January – 	Alice's Adventures in Wonderland
18 February –	Post & Go: Working Sail
19 February –	Inventive Britain
5 March –	Bridges
1 April – 	Comedy Greats
6 May –	The 175th Anniversary of the Penny Black
13 May –	Post & Go: Heraldic Beasts
14 May – 	First World War
2 June – 	Magna Carta
18 June – 	The Battle of Waterloo (200th anniversary)
16 July –	The 75th Anniversary of the Battle of Britain
18 August –	Bees
9 September –	Long to Reign Over Us (Her Majesty The Queen becoming the longest reigning UK monarch)
16 September –	Post & Go: Sea Travel
18 September – Rugby World Cup
20 October – 	Star Wars
3 November –	Christmas 2015

2016
7 January – 	Shackleton and the Endurance Expedition
28 January –	Duke of Edinburgh Awards: 60th anniversary
17 February –	Royal Mail 500 – Post & Go: Royal Mail Heritage
18 February –	Penny Red Generic Sheet – Royal Mail Heritage PSB
15 March –	British Humanitarians
5 April – 	William Shakespeare (400th anniversary of his death)
21 April – 	HM The Queen's 90th Birthday
25 April – 	First World War: ANZAC
17 May – 	Animail
28 May –	New York 2016 FIP Exhibition
21 June – 	First World War: 1916
7 July – 	Music Giants: Pink Floyd
28 July – 	Beatrix Potter
16 August –	Landscape Gardens
2 September –	Great Fire of London
14 September –	Post & Go: Ladybirds
15 September – Agatha Christie
14 October –	Battle of Hastings: 950th anniversary
20 October –	Mr Men and Little Misses
8 November –	Christmas 2016
14 November –	Post & Go: Hibernating Animals

2017

 17 January  – Ancient Britain 
 6 February  – 65th Anniversary of the Accession 
 15 February  – Windsor Castle
 15 February  – Post and Go Postal Heritage: Mail by Rail 
 14 March  – Music Giants II – David Bowie
 21 March  – New Machin and Country Definitives
 6 April  – Racehorse Legends
 4 May  –  Songbirds
 24 May  – Exhibition Generic Sheet: Finlandia 2017  
 5 June  –  Machin Definitive 50th anniversary
 5 June  –  Machin Anniversary Post and Go
 13 June  – HRH The Princess Royal 
 20 June  – Windmills and Watermills 
 30 June  – Celebrating Canada 
 13 July  – Landmark Buildings  
 31 July  – World War I (1917)  
 22 August  – Classic Toys 
 13 September  – Post and Go Postal Heritage: Mail by Air
 13 September  – Opening of The Postal Museum
 14 September  – Ladybird Books
 12 October  – Star Wars
 7 November  – Christmas

 20 November – The Royal Wedding: Platinum Anniversary

2018

 23 January   – Game of Thrones
 23 January   – Post and Go – Game of Thrones
 15 February   – Votes for Women
 20 March   – Royal Air Force Centenary 
 17 April   – Reintroduced Species 
 11 May   – Owls
 19 May – Wedding of Prince Harry and Meghan Markle – using engagement photographs by Alexi Lubomirski
 1 June – 150th Anniversary of Trades Union Congress
 5 June   – Royal Academy of Arts
 26 June   – Dad's Army
 31 July   – Hampton Court Palace 
 16 August   – Captain Cook and Endeavour
 30 August   – The Old Vic
 12 September   – Royal Mail Heritage – Mail by Bike 
 13 September   – First World War 1918 
 16 October   – Harry Potter and J.K. Rowling's Wizarding World
 1 November   – Christmas 
 14 November   – HRH The Prince of Wales – 70th Birthday

2019

 15 January   – Stamp Classics
 13 February  – Leonardo da Vinci
 14 March     – Marvel
  4 April     – Birds of Prey
  2 May       – British Engineering
 24 May       – Queen Victoria Bicentenary
  6 June      – D-Day
  9 July      – Curious Customs
 13 August    – Forests
  3 September – Music Giants – Elton John
 19 September – Royal Navy Ships
 26 September – ICC Men's Cricket World Cup 2019 / ICC Women's World Cup 2017
 10 October   – The Gruffalo
  5 November  – Christmas
 xx November  – Star Wars

2020

 21 January    – Video Games
 11 February   – Visions of the Universe
 17 March      – James Bond
  7 April      – The Romantic Poets
  8 May        – End of the Second World War
 28 May        – Coronation Street
 18 June       – Roman Britain
  9 July       – Queen
 30 July       – The Palace of Westminster
 18 August     – Sherlock
  3 September  – Rupert Bear
  1 October    – Brilliant Bugs
  3 November   – Christmas
 13 November   – Star Trek

2021
 14 January    – UK National Parks
 26 January    – United Kingdom: A Celebration (Great Creativity; Great Industry and Innovation; Great Industry and Innovation; Great Sport)
 16 February   – Only Fools and Horses (television program, 40th anniversary of first broadcast)
 16 March      – The Legend of King Arthur (550th anniversary of the death of Sir Thomas Malory)
 29 March      – Queen Legends
 15 April      – Classic Science Fiction (75th anniversary of the death of H. G. Wells and the 70th anniversary of the publication of The Day of the Triffids)
 4 May         – The Wars of the Roses (450th anniversaries of the Battle of Tewkesbury and the Battle of Barnet)
 28 May        – Paul McCartney
 24 June       – In Memoriam - HRH The Prince Philip, Duke of Edinburgh
 1 July        – Dennis and Gnasher (70th anniversary of first publication)
 22 July       – Wild Coasts
 12 August     – Industrial Revolutions
 2 September   – British Army Vehicles
 17 September  – DC Comics collection          
 19 October    – Rugby Union
 2 November    – Christmas 2021

2022
 February – Barcoded everyday "definitive" and Christmas stamps introduced after trials; non-barcoded "definitive" stamps no longer valid from 1 February 2023

See also
Postage stamps and postal history of the United Kingdom
Regional postage stamps of the United Kingdom
 United Kingdom commemorative stamps 1924–1969
 United Kingdom commemorative stamps 1970–1979
 United Kingdom commemorative stamps 1980–1989
 United Kingdom commemorative stamps 1990–1999
 United Kingdom commemorative stamps 2000–2009
 United Kingdom commemorative stamps 2010–2019
 United Kingdom commemorative stamps 2020–2029

Notes

External links
 British Postal Museum & Archive

Postage stamps of the United Kingdom
Postage stamps